So Stylistic is an album recorded by New York City rap group FannyPack. This, their debut album, featured the hit songs "Cameltoe," "Things," and "Hey, Mami."

Track listing

References

External links
 

FannyPack albums
2003 debut albums
Tommy Boy Records albums